100 höjdare ("100 Highlights") was a Swedish TV series which was produced and aired on Kanal 5. Six seasons of the show were produced and it ran from 2004 to 2008. It was hosted by the comedy duo Filip Hammar & Fredrik Wikingsson.

In the first three seasons the hosts presented funny moments, often in the form of video clips, listing their 100 all-time favorites. In season two and three they also discuss the clips with celebrity guests. By season four the format changed and instead of showing clips, Filip and Fredrik made impromptu interviews with people, often in their homes.

Season overview

Original format
The first season, "Sweden's 100 Funniest Moments", first aired on 5 September 2004 and consisted of nine 25 minute episodes. Wikingsson and Hammar presented the clips in a summer-themed outdoor environment.

The show lists funny moments and people that are not intended to be funny, i.e., no sketches or jokes, etc. The clips are chosen by the hosts and reflect their kind of humour. The well known Swedish sports commentator Bosse Hansson gave voice-overs on the video clips and animations illustrating the funny moments in the first two seasons. The theme song is "Pretty Belinda" by Hammar, Wikingsson and their producer André Linschooten. The trio called themselves Fille and the Fittpippers when releasing the song; the song was originally made by Chris Andrews.

Season two, first aired on 7 March 2005, consisted of ten 45 minute episodes. The theme for season two was "The World's 100 Funniest Moments". The production was now a bit more expensive and the show took place in a studio with live audience and one or two invited guests for each show. Season two featured a part of the programme entitled "Luca's Ladder", in which Wikingson & Hammars' gay Italian friend Luca Brasi presented one of his favourite clip from the first season.

Despite its title, season three of 100 höjdare consisted of eight different top ten lists, making it only 80 highlights. As in season two, each episode is 45 minutes and takes place in a studio with guests commenting the clips. Season three first aired on 21 November 2005.

New format
In season four, Fredrik and Filip try to find Sweden's 100 most original people. The winner of each show was invited for a grand finale where an overall winner was selected. Season four first aired on 28 August 2006. Season five, airing in 2007, was similar to season four, but included people from all over Scandinavia.

In season six, first aired on 17 March 2008, they travel around America trying to find "100 reasons to love the United States" in the form of very unusual people. In the last episode, similar to season four and five, they crown "America's most extraordinary person".

Episode overview

Kanal 5 (Swedish TV channel) original programming
Swedish comedy television series